The Glaser-Dirks DG-400 is a single-seat self-launching motorglider that was produced by Glaser-Dirks between 1981 and 1992. It was the first self-launching motorglider with retractable engine and propeller to be produced in large numbers.

Development
The cost of carbon-fibre had fallen enough in the late 1970s to allow its use in the wing spars of high-performance gliders. Glaser-Dirks introduced a carbon wing variant of the DG-200 about this time. Designer Wilhelm Dirks realised that the span, strength and very low weight of this wing allowed for a self-launching engine to be carried in the glider without an unacceptable penalty when soaring in weak conditions. The DG-400 was created as a result. It first flew in May 1981.

The DG-400 uses the wings and most systems of the DG-202. It has a modified fuselage with a slightly enlarged tailcone and carbon fibre reinforcements to accommodate the engine, which is a relatively large unit with electric starter and electric retraction. This powerful installation, with a user-friendly engine control unit, made the DG-400 easier to operate than other self-launching gliders.

As was typical for the time, the engine, propeller and supporting pylon constitute a single unit that extends into the airflow (in more recent self-launchers the engine usually stays inside the fuselage). The type may be flown either with 15 metre or 17 metre wingtips.

The DG-400 was not aimed at competitions, but rather at leisure flying. Nevertheless, several World Gliding Records have been achieved flying this type.

Specifications (17 metre wings)

References

External links

DG-Flugzeugbau website
Sailplane Directory
DG400 pictures & details
German Gliding Magazine

1980s German sailplanes
DG Flugzeugbau aircraft
Single-engined tractor aircraft
Mid-engined aircraft
Motor gliders
T-tail aircraft
Mid-wing aircraft
Aircraft first flown in 1981